QA Technologies Ltd. is a telematics company based in Saskatoon, Saskatchewan that develops fleet management technologies to the transportation industry. The company conducts in-house research and development and markets two main products, AccutrAVL and AccutreQ.net.

History
QA Technologies was founded in 2002 by parent company DynaVenture Corp. The Saskatoon based technology company has provided custom built software to organizations such as Purolator Courier, SaskTel and Frito-Lay Canada.

References

External links
 QA Technologies Official Site
 PressurePro's Official Blog

Canadian companies established in 2002
Companies based in Saskatoon